Mingo Cay is a rugged, uninhabited,  island in the United States Virgin Islands. Administratively, it is part of the Central subdistrict of St. John.

Formerly privately owned, the island was donated to a land conservation trust in 2021.

References

Islands of the United States Virgin Islands